Walter Ramme (born January 28, 1895 in Braunschweig, Germany, date of death unknown) was a German freestyle swimmer who competed in the 1912 Summer Olympics. He competed for the sports club MTV Braunschweig and later won fifth place in the 100 metre freestyle event. In 1913 he emigrated to the United States of America.

References

External links
Profile at sports-reference.com

1895 births
Sportspeople from Braunschweig
Year of death missing
German male swimmers
German male freestyle swimmers
Olympic swimmers of Germany
Swimmers at the 1912 Summer Olympics